Papyrus 31 (in the Gregory-Aland numbering), designated by 𝔓31, is an early copy of the New Testament in Greek. It is a papyrus manuscript of the Epistle to the Romans, it contains only Romans 12:3-8. The manuscript paleographically has been assigned to the 7th century. The reverse side is blank. It is possible that it was used as a talisman. Hunt suggested it was a lectionary.

Description 

Written in medium-sized sloping uncial letters. It seems to have been copied for reading in church.

The Greek text of this codex is a representative of the Alexandrian text-type. Aland placed it in Category II. An agreement with Codex Sinaiticus against the other chief MSS is observable in l. 9 of the fragment (v. 8).

Papyrus 31 presents unique readings in l. 3 (v. 4) and l. 4 (v. 5) against the other chief MSS.

It is currently housed with the Rylands Papyri at the John Rylands University Library (Gr. P. 4) in Manchester.

See also 

 List of New Testament papyri

References

Further reading 

 A. S. Hunt, Catalogue of the Greek Papyri in the John Rylands Library I, Literatury Texts (Manchester 1911), p. 9.

External links 
 

New Testament papyri
7th-century biblical manuscripts
Epistle to the Romans papyri